The Iron Hand is a 1916 drama film directed by Ulysses Davis. It is not known whether the film currently survives.

Plot
Politician Tim Noland, and his companion Slim are both arrested. When they are both arrested, Noland decides to stop being a criminal, while Slim does not. Slim dies, and Tim adopts his son, Roy. Noland allows a doctor to raise Roy after he promises that raising him in a crime-free environment will allow him to grow up to be a law-abiding adult. Twenty years later, Roy falls in love with and becomes engaged to Enid Winslow, a social reformer who is the daughter of Mr. Winslow, a politician running against Tim in an election. Mr. Winslow wins the election, but he refuses to let Enid marry Roy. Mr. Winslow eventually allows the wedding to proceed after Tim offers to pay for his campaign debts.

Cast
Edward Clark as Jerry Simpson
Hobart Bosworth as Tim Noland
Jack Curtis as Connors
William V. Mong as Slim
Maude George as Slim's wife
Frank Newburg as Roy
Winifred Harris as Mr. Winslow
Jane Novak as Enid Winslow

References

External links

1916 films
American black-and-white films
Silent American drama films
1916 drama films
American silent feature films
1910s American films